The 1989 Tennents' Sixes was the sixth staging of the indoor 6-a-side football tournament. For the fourth time it was held at the Scottish Exhibition and Conference Centre (SECC) in Glasgow on 22 and 23 January.

The format had been reverted to 2 groups of five as the number of Premier Division clubs had been reduced to 10 at the start of the 1988-89 season and all the clubs from the tier competed.

The two group winners and runners-up qualified to the semi-finals which included the Old Firm playing together and Rangers beat Motherwell 2–1 in the final to win their second Sixes title.

Group 1

Group 2

Semi-finals

Final

References

External links
Scottish Football Historical Archive
Tournament programme

1988–89 in Scottish football
1980s in Glasgow
Tennents' Sixes
Sports competitions in Glasgow
Football in Glasgow
January 1989 sports events in the United Kingdom